Viva Caruso is one of Joe Lovano's "most ambitious and enjoyable recordings". Inspired by the legendary Italian tenor, Enrico Caruso, Lovano deftly, yet directly, applies orchestral melodies and figures in different manners to create a beautifully meditative collection of music. The album features several different tracks, each focusing on a different interpretation of classical music in the jazz realm.

Track listing
 "Vesti la giubba - Leoncavallo - 3:48
 "Tarantella Sincera for voice & orchestra - DeCrescenzo - 4:42
 "The Streets of Naples" - Lovano - 4:57
 "Cielo Turchino for voice & orchestra [Deep Blue Sky] - Ciociano - 4:42
 "Pecchè? for voice & orchestra [Why?] - Pennino - 7:39
 "O sole mio, for voice & piano (or orchestra)" - DeCapua - 6:47
 "Viva Caruso" - Lovano - 4:18
 "Campane a sera "Ave Maria", for voice & orchestra [Evening Bells]" - Billi - 7:02
 "Santa Lucia, Neapolitan song" - Traditional - 4:25
 "Sultanto a Te for voice & orchestra [Only to You]" - Fuciio - 5:57
 "Il Carnivale di Pulcinella - Lovano - 6:42
 "For You Alone for voice & piano (or orchestra) - Geehl, O'Reilly - 4:07

Personnel
Joe Lovano – tenor sax (on all tracks)
Joe Lovano Street Band (tracks 1, 3, 6, 7, 9, 11)
Joe Lovano – arrangements and orchestrations
Ed Schuller and Scott Lee – bass (both on all tracks)
Gil Goldstein – accordion (3, 7)
Joey Baron – drums (3, 7, 9, 11)
Carmen Castaldi – drums (1, 6, 7, 11)
Bob Meyer – mallets (1), drums (6, 7, 11)
Jamey Haddad – mazhar (frame drum) (11)
Michael Bocian – acoustic guitar (11)
Judi Silvano – voice and flute (11)
Billy Drewes – clarinet (11)
Herb Robertson – trumpet (11)
Gary Valente – trombone (11)

Opera House Ensemble (tracks 2, 4, 5, 8, 10, 12)
Byron Olson – arrangements, orchestrations, conductor 
Helen Campo – flute
Dick Oatts – flute
Billy Drewes – clarinet
Charles Russo – bass clarinet
Kim Lackowski – bassoon
Michael Rabinowitz – bassoon
Tom Christianson – oboe, English horn
John Clark – French horn
Ed Schuller – bass (tracks 2, 4, 8)
Judi Silvano – voice (5 & 8)
Gil Goldstein – accordion (5, 10, 12)
Scott Lee – bass (5, 10, 12)

References

External links
 

2002 albums
Joe Lovano albums
Blue Note Records albums